Irene Prescott (born 21 June 1994) is a Tongan swimmer. She competed in the women's 50 metre freestyle event at the 2016 Summer Olympics, where she ranked 61st with a time of 28.68 seconds. She did not advance to the semifinals.

References

External links
 

1994 births
Living people
Tongan female swimmers
Olympic swimmers of Tonga
Swimmers at the 2016 Summer Olympics
Commonwealth Games competitors for Tonga
Swimmers at the 2014 Commonwealth Games
Place of birth missing (living people)
Tongan female freestyle swimmers
20th-century Tongan women
21st-century Tongan women